Kadir Arslan (born April 20, 1977 in Ankara) is a Turkish volleyball player. He is 1.94m tall and plays as a passer.

Arslan has played for the Fenerbahçe Men's Volleyball team since the start of the 2007 season, and wears a number 7 jersey. He played 40 times for the national team. He also played for Arçelik, İstanbul Büyükşehir Belediyespor and Erdemir.

References

1977 births
Living people
Sportspeople from Ankara
Turkish men's volleyball players
Fenerbahçe volleyballers